= Wildcat Apollo =

- Origin: Brooklyn, New York
- Genres: Indie rock, psychedelic pop, shoegazing, garage rock, psychedelic rock, pop rock, dance-rock
- Years active: 2012–present
- Labels: Self-released
- Members: Cat Tassini, Taylor Eichenseer, Aaron Eichenseer, Alex Margolin, Caitlin Callas
- Past members: Danny Ferraro
- Website: WildcatApollo.com

Wildcat Apollo is an American indie rock and psychedelic pop band. Formed in Brooklyn in 2012, the band is currently based in Austin, Texas and its members include Cat Tassini (vocals, synths), Taylor Eichenseer (guitar, vocals), Aaron Eichenseer (guitar, bass), Alex Margolin (drums), and Caitlin Callas (cello and backing vocals). Their self-titled debut album was released in late 2013, which Brooklyn Exposed stated "seamlessly weaves between intense folk rock and an ambient, ethereal sound." Their song "The Colorado" won the Rock Category Grand Prize at The John Lennon Songwriting Contest later that year. The band regularly performs live, and has played at SXSW 2014 and the Vans Warped Tour.

== History ==
=== 1990s-2011: Member background ===
Previous to forming the originally four-member band Wildcat Apollo, three of the members had grown up together in Austin, Texas, collaborating in various band incarnations over the years. Brothers Taylor and Aaron Eichenseer had started jamming on rock music as early as the late 1990s, recording various demos on cassette tape together. The elder brother, Aaron, had played guitar from early childhood, while Taylor began playing intently in high school. Their friend Alex Margolin had learned drums by periodically playing with the Eichenseer brothers starting in 2005. After high school the members scattered to attend various colleges, though in 2012 the three friends met back up in Brooklyn. That summer they started rehearsing garage rock songs written by Taylor, and soon started writing songs as a group.

=== 2012-2013: Founding, debut album ===
Wildcat Apollo was officially formed as an indie rock/synthpop band in 2012 by Alex Margolin and Taylor and Aaron Eichenseer. Vocalist Cat Tassini joined the group several months later, after moving into Taylor Eichenseer's apartment while the band was forming. While the members periodically switch vocal duties and instruments, the standard lineup includes Tassini on synthesizer, percussion and vocals, Taylor Eichenseer on guitar and singing, Aaron Eichenseer on guitar and bass, and Margolin on drums, percussion and synthesizer.

They spent much of 2013 working on their sound in a basement in Bushwick, Brooklyn. Later that summer the band traveled to Austin to rehearse and record their debut album. Titled Wildcat Apollo, it was recorded at The Bubble studios, with Frenchie Smith and Taylor Eichenseer co-producing. It was self-released by the band on October 30, 2013. The 12-track album met with a largely positive response from music critics. According to The Deli Magazine, the "LP has warranted much attention with its lush, psych-pop sensibilities strewn over vocalists; Cat Tassini and Taylor Eichenseer's seraphic cadence." About the record's sound, AudioFemme stated that it "combines elements of garage rock and dancey shoegaze, full of catchy bass lines and innovative guitar hooks," and Brooklyn Exposed stated it "seamlessly weaves between intense folk rock and an ambient, ethereal sound."

Their song "The Colorado" from the album won the Rock Category Grand Prize at The John Lennon Songwriting Contest of 2013. Several music videos have resulted from the album; in late 2013, Tassini directed and edited a music video for the track “No. 6," showing it at the RAW:Brooklyn group showcase in October. Also in October, the Wildcat Apollo video for "Sleepwalking" was shown at the Bushwick Film Festival. In December 2013 the band shot a music video for their track "K.C. Zombie." "KC Zombie" recently premiered on Anon Magazine. It was directed and edited by Cat Tassini in collaboration with Bull Moose Productions.

=== 2014-present: Move to Austin ===
As of November 2013 all the members lived in New York excluding Aaron, who would travel from Austin to join them at live performances. By December the band was planning a permanent move to Austin, and after a series of performances in Brooklyn, all the members relocated to Austin by January 2014. That March they performed at SXSW 2014, and in June the band spent a week touring with the Vans Warped Tour. The band announced that keyboardist Danny Ferraro had joined the lineup in 2014.

== Style ==
While primarily an indie rock group, the band draws from diverse influences and incorporates the rock genres of shoegazing, garage, psychedelic, pop and dance-rock. All members contribute to the songwriting process. According to drummer Alex Margolin the band is experimental in their approach with each track, and, "We approach creating music in many different ways. Usually, one of us has an idea for a song or a basic piece of music and the rest of us try to expand on that idea." Stated Taylor Eichenseer, "We also do a lot of jamming and recording of jamming with a loop pedal or on a computer. This is great because it lets the music be the guide, and you can turn your brain off and just let it flow and figure out what happened after the fact."

== Members ==
Band members as of 2014

- Taylor Eichenseer - vocals, guitar, bass (2011–present)
- Aaron Eichenseer - guitar, bass (2011–present)
- Alex Margolin - drums, synth (2011–present)

Past

- Cat Tassini - vocals, synth, percussion (2012–2016)
- Caitlin Callas - voila, bass, backing vocals (2014)
- Danny Ferraro - keyboards (2014)

== Discography ==
=== Studio albums ===
Studio albums by Wildcat Apollo
Year	Title	Release details
2013	Wildcat Apollo	Released: Oct 30, 2013; Label: self-released; Format: CD, digital

=== Singles ===
Selected songs by Wildcat Apollo
Year	Title	Album	Notes
2013	"The Colorado"	Wildcat; Apollo	"Best Rock Song"
2013	"KC Zombie"	Wildcat; Apollo	Music video
2013	"No. 6"	Wildcat; Apollo	Music video

== Awards ==
Year	Award	Nominated work	Category	Result
2013	John Lennon; Songwriting Contest	"The Colorado" by Wildcat Apollo	Best Rock Song	Won

== See also ==
- Warped Tour 2014
